Łąkoć may refer to the following places in Poland:
Łąkoć, Lublin Voivodeship (east Poland)
Łąkoć, Pomeranian Voivodeship (north Poland)